The 2017–18 Israel Youth State Cup (Gvia HaMedina LeNoar) was the 63rd season of Israel's nationwide football cup competition.

The competition was won by Hapoel Ramat HaSharon, who had beaten Hapoel Kiryat Shmona in the final.

Results

Bracket
Premier League club joined the competition at the fourth round.

Final

References

External links
 Israel Football Association website 

Israel Youth State Cup
State Youth Cup